The Palestinian Tennis Association is located in Beit Sahour. The Palestinian Tennis Federation is located in Gaza Strip, The president of the Federation is Dr. Damen El Wahidi. 

 .

National members of the Asian Tennis Federation
Tennis